Anders Bjarne Moe, born 1948, is an economist and former Norwegian civil servant. He holds a cand.oecon. degree from the University of Oslo. In 1988, he was appointed as Director General of the Oil Division of the Norwegian Ministry of Petroleum and Energy. Moe was a member of several government commissions, committees, and boards:

 Statfjord Commission - Leader
 Statfjord Natural Gas Transport Commission - Leader
 Murchison Commission - Leader
 Ekofisk-Teesside Commission - Leader
 Ekofisk-Emden Commission - Leader
 Frigg Commission - Leader
 Council on War Readiness on the Norwegian Continental Shelf - Leader
 NATO Wartime Oil Organization - Norwegian representative
 Petroleum Price Board
 Natural Gas Commission
 Heimdal Commission
 Committee on Investments on the Norwegian Continental Shelf

He has also served as a diplomat at the Norwegian Embassy in Washington, DC.

References 

1948 births
Living people
Norwegian economists
Norwegian civil servants
Norwegian expatriates in the United States